John Benett (1773–1852), of Pythouse, Wiltshire, was an English politician.

He was a Member (MP) of the Parliament of the United Kingdom for Wiltshire 1819 to 1832 and for South Wiltshire from 1832 to 1852.

Biography 
Benett was born on 20 May 1773 in Wiltshire. He was the son of Thomas Benett (1729–1797) of Pythouse in West Tisbury, and his second wife Catherine Darell (d.1790), daughter of James Darell. His maternal grandfather was William Wake DD, Archbishop of Canterbury. His sister was the geologist Etheldred Benett.

He commissioned the rebuilding of Pythouse, completed in 1805.

He married in 1801 Lucy, daughter of Edmund Lambert of Boyton Manor, also in Wiltshire. They had two sons and five daughters, among them:

 Etheldred, married in 1827 Lord Charles Spencer-Churchill, second son of the 5th Duke of Marlborough
 Lucy, married Rev. Arthur Fane, younger son of General Sir Henry Fane; Arthur was later vicar of Warminster.

References

1773 births
1852 deaths
Members of the Parliament of the United Kingdom for Wiltshire
UK MPs 1818–1820
UK MPs 1820–1826
UK MPs 1826–1830
UK MPs 1830–1831
UK MPs 1831–1832
UK MPs 1832–1835
UK MPs 1835–1837
UK MPs 1837–1841
UK MPs 1841–1847
UK MPs 1847–1852